The Stately Home Tour was a 2000 concert tour by Elton John. After completing the Medusa Tour, Elton decided to tour some of the stately homes of Europe, mainly covering England and Germany. The tour started on 27 May 2000 in Bedfordshire and ended on 30 July 2000 in Edinburgh, Scotland.

The tour continued in the same way as the previous two tours Medusa Tour and An Evening with Elton John in the respect that they were all solo performances.

Tour dates

Setlists

References

External links
 Information Site with Tour Dates

Elton John concert tours
2000 concert tours